Račica (in older sources also Raščica) is a settlement in the Municipality of Šmartno pri Litiji in central Slovenia. It lies in the hills west of Šmartno pri Litiji in the historical region of Lower Carniola. The area is included in the Central Slovenia Statistical Region.

References

External links
Račica at Geopedia

Populated places in the Municipality of Šmartno pri Litiji